Philip Egerton may refer to:

Sir Philip Egerton (died 1698), of Oulton, Tory landowner, MP for Cheshire (UK Parliament constituency)
Sir Philip Grey Egerton, 9th Baronet (1767–1829)
Sir Philip Grey Egerton, 10th Baronet (1806–1881), English palaeontologist and Conservative politician
Philip Egerton (priest) (1832–1911), English schoolmaster, priest, and cricketer
Sir Philip Grey-Egerton, 11th Baronet (1833–1891), of the Grey Egerton baronets
Sir Philip Grey Egerton, 12th Baronet (1864–1937), British Army officer
Sir Philip Reginald le Belward Grey Egerton, 14th Baronet (1885 –1962), British Army officer